Shiva Swaroop was an Indian Police Officer. He served as the Director General of Central Reserve Police Force in Nagaland from 1975 to 1981. Later, he was the Lieutenant Governor of Arunachal Pradesh from November 1985 to February 1987.

References

Possibly living people
Governors of Arunachal Pradesh
Indian police officers